The Buena Vista Hills are a low mountain range in the Peninsular Ranges System, in western San Diego County, California.

They are located in the San Marcos region of the county.

References 

Mountain ranges of San Diego County, California
Peninsular Ranges
Hills of California
Mountain ranges of Southern California